Porsha Dyanne Guobadia (née Williams, formerly Stewart, born June 22, 1981) is an American television personality, actress, and author. Williams starred on the television series The Real Housewives of Atlanta from 2012 until 2021, when she departed to star in her spin-off series, Porsha's Family Matters. She also served as co-host of Dish Nation from 2013 until 2021. She later became co-host of Bravo's Chat Room in 2020 alongside fellow Real Housewife Gizelle Bryant. In 2021, Williams published her memoir, The Pursuit of Porsha.

Early life and education
Williams was born in Atlanta, Georgia on June 22, 1981. Her parents are self-employed entrepreneurs. She has a younger half sister named Lauren with whom they share a father, and a brother named Hosea. Her grandfather is the late Hosea Williams, a civil rights activist. She attended Southwest Dekalb High School in Decatur, Georgia as a teenager, and later pursued a degree in business information technology at the American InterContinental University.

Career

Early career
In 2005, when she was 24 years old, Williams opened a daycare facility, revealing that she was inspired by her parents' careers. Also in 2005, Williams modeled for a "pin-up" calendar for the Atlanta Dymes. Williams met football player Kordell Stewart in 2009. The couple married in May 2011, which was filmed and broadcast for the WE tv television series Platinum Weddings. Through the marriage, she became the stepmother to his minor-aged son Syre from his previous relationship with Tania Richardson.

2012–present: The Real Housewives of Atlanta, The Celebrity Apprentice, and music
In September 2012, it was announced by Bravo that Williams and Kenya Moore were cast for the fifth season of the reality television series The Real Housewives of Atlanta, alongside returning cast members Cynthia Bailey, Kandi Burruss, NeNe Leakes, Phaedra Parks and Kim Zolciak. Williams made her first appearance of the season during the third episode on November 18, 2012, where she was shown to clash with Moore during a charity event for Feed the Homeless. The remainder of the season documented their ensuing feud, and a later conflict with Bailey after she felt that Williams lacked dedication to a pageant Bailey coordinated for her modeling agency.

She additionally expressed an intent to have children with Stewart, although she later visited a therapist after they began experiencing marital difficulties.
After approximately two years of marriage, Stewart filed for divorce from Williams in March 2013. During the reunion special for the fifth season of The Real Housewives of Atlanta the following month, she commented that she was "totally blindsided" by the filing and alleged that she learned of their separation through Twitter. Their divorce was finalized in December 2013; Williams received none of his property or earnings through the settlement.

The sixth season of The Real Housewives of Atlanta premiered in November, and documented the deterioration of Williams's relationship with her husband. She was briefly hospitalized during the season, which the series depicted was caused by stress stemming from her then-ongoing divorce.
After an episode of The Real Housewives of Atlanta broadcast in December 2013, Williams received criticism after making comments in which she indicated her belief that the Underground Railroad was an actual railroad line. She later commented that "It was a brain lapse. I have Porsha moments that you’ve seen on the show before. For me seeing that I knew that I had to go back and brush up on my history so I’m representing my legacy well." She also joined the cast of Burruss's stage musical A Mother's Love.

She released her debut single "Flatline" through the iTunes Store on March 17, 2014. Later that month, Williams received media attention after an altercation with Moore while filming the sixth season reunion for The Real Housewives of Atlanta. While filming the reunion special at the Biltmore Hotel on March 27, Moore implied that Williams was unfaithful during her marriage; after Williams called Moore a "slut from the '90s" and Moore yelled that Williams was "a dumb ho" from a megaphone, Williams assaulted Moore. Moore later threatened to quit the series if Williams was to remain, commenting that "we've become angry with each other, we've threatened each other and gone to the edge. But at the end of the day, we know there's a line." Williams was arrested on December 29, 2014, for speeding with a suspended license, but was released the same day.

In September 2015, Bravo announced that Williams had signed on to return as a main cast member, along with new cast member and actress Kim Fields. On January 28, 2016, it was announced that she is participating as a contestant on The New Celebrity Apprentice, also known as The Apprentice 15 and The Celebrity Apprentice 8. On September 19, 2018, Williams announced her pregnancy. On October 1, it was reported that she was engaged to entrepreneur Dennis McKinley. The proposal was shown on The Real Housewives of Atlanta (S11 Ep15) which aired February 17, 2019. On March 22, 2019, she gave birth to their daughter, Pilar Jhena showcased on her first spin-off Porsha's Having a Baby. Williams and McKinley briefly split in June, but have reunited as of August.

2021–present: Activism, The Pursuit of Porsha, and Porsha's Family Matters
Williams departed the Real Housewives of Atlanta after its thirteenth season in 2021 to star in Porsha's Family Matters, a spin-off series which has aired only one season. Williams' time on the Real Housewives earned her a loyal fanbase; her story arc, which documented nearly ten years of Williams' life, is considered one of the franchise's greatest. Williams' departure was met with disappointment from fans and critics. The Cut reported in 2021 that "Porsha’s ability to weather the storm, and her personal growth both in front of and away from the cameras, made her one of the most dynamic and likable Housewives in any city."

Since the murder of George Floyd, Williams has worked as an activist and was described by The New York Times as becoming "a crusader against police violence." On July 15, 2020, Williams was among 87 protesters who were arrested outside the home of Kentucky Attorney General Daniel Cameron. She was calling for Cameron to arrest the officers involved in the Shooting of Breonna Taylor. After law enforcement warned that staying on Cameron's property was unlawful, Williams and others in the group were charged with intimidating a participant in a legal process, disorderly conduct and criminal trespass. She was released the next day. In 2021, Williams published her memoir, The Pursuit of Porsha, which has been met with acclaim from fans.

Music career
Williams produced a single and music video titled “Flatline”, and performed another song called “Legs, Hips, Body” featuring Kandi Burruss, and D. Woods, and also featured in many more songs for Burruss’, A Mother’s Love musical, that is available to stream on iTunes / Apple Music.

Personal life
Porsha was married to Kordell Stewart in 2011. During their marriage she suffered a miscarriage. Stewart filed for divorce in 2013. She was briefly engaged to entrepreneur Dennis McKinley, and she gave birth to their first child, Pilar Jhena in March 2019. In May 2021, Porsha confirmed that she is engaged to Simon Guobadia. Porsha and Simon held a traditional Nigerian wedding on November 25th, 2022, followed by a traditional American wedding on November 26th, 2022.

Filmography

Stage

Discography
Singles

References

External links
 

1981 births
Actresses from Atlanta
Actresses from Georgia (U.S. state)
African-American television personalities
Living people
People from Atlanta
The Real Housewives of Atlanta
The Real Housewives cast members
The Apprentice (franchise) contestants
21st-century African-American people
21st-century African-American women
20th-century African-American people
20th-century African-American women